Ilias Zouros or Elias Zouros (Greek: Ηλίας Ζούρος; born March 11, 1966) is a Greek professional basketball coach, who last managed Promitheas Patras of the Greek Basket League and the EuroCup.

Club coaching career
Some of the teams Zouros has been a head coach of include: Olympiacos Piraeus, Sagesse Beirut, Peristeri Athens, Aris Thessaloniki, Paris Basket Racing, Panellinios Athens, Žalgiris Kaunas, and Efes Istanbul.

He was named the 2010 EuroCup Coach of the Year. He returned to coach Žalgiris Kaunas in 2013. He was fired after a poor start in the season.

On June 25, 2019, he signed with Peristeri of the Greek Basket League. On November 29, 2019, his contract has been terminated by Peristeri.

Greek national team coaching career
Zouros was announced as the new head coach of the senior men's Greek national basketball team in March 2011. He coached Greece at the EuroBasket 2011. After the failure of Greece to qualify for the 2012 Summer Olympics at the 2012 FIBA World Olympic Qualifying Tournament, Zouros' contract to coach the Greek national team was not renewed.

Coaching titles
Sagesse (2003–04): 
Lebanese Basketball League Champion: (2004) 
FIBA Asia Champions Cup Champion: (2004)
Žalgiris (2011): 
Baltic League Champion: (2011)
Lithuanian League Champion: (2011)
Lithuanian Cup Winner: (2011)

Coaching awards
EuroCup Coach of the Year: (2010)

References

External links
Official Blog 
Euroleague.net Coaching Profile
Eurobasket.com Coaching Profile
Panellinios B.C. Head Coach: Ilias Zouros

1966 births
Living people
Anadolu Efes S.K. coaches
Aris B.C. coaches
Basketbol Süper Ligi head coaches
BC Žalgiris coaches
Greek basketball coaches
Greek expatriate basketball people in France
Greek expatriate basketball people in Lithuania
Greek expatriate basketball people in Turkey
Greece national basketball team coaches
KK Budućnost coaches
Levallois Metropolitans coaches
Olympiacos B.C. coaches
Panellinios B.C. coaches
Paris Racing Basket coaches
Peristeri B.C. coaches
Promitheas Patras B.C. coaches
Sagesse SC basketball coaches